Raichur Lok Sabha constituency is one of the 28 Lok Sabha (parliamentary) constituencies in Karnataka state in southern India. This constituency is reserved for the candidates belonging to the Scheduled tribes.

Assembly segments
Raichur Lok Sabha constituency presently comprises the following eight Legislative Assembly segments:

Members of Parliament

Election results

2019

2014

See also
 Kushtagi Lok Sabha constituency
 List of Constituencies of the Lok Sabha
 Raichur district
 Yadgir Lok Sabha constituency

References

Lok Sabha constituencies in Karnataka
Raichur district